The Brabham BT54 was a Formula One racing car designed by Gordon Murray for the Brabham team for the  Formula One season. The car was powered by the BMW M12 4cyl turbo engine (generally agreed to be the most powerful engine in Formula One at the time) and used Pirelli tyres.

Design and testing
Like its immediate predecessors, the BT54 had most of its weight towards the rear of the car to help improve traction.

However, when the French company pulled out of Grand Prix racing at the end of that season, team owner Bernie Ecclestone took a gamble and instead of signing with Goodyear for their proven rubber, signed with the Italian company Pirelli instead.

The car proved to be competitive, but somewhat unsuccessful even in the hands of two time world champion Nelson Piquet. The reason for this turned out to be the Pirelli tyres which proved to be nowhere near as good as the Goodyear tyres used by rivals McLaren, Lotus, Ferrari and Williams. Part of the BT54's problem was that unlike the other teams who had tested their cars during the European winter, Piquet had spent a southern hemisphere summer testing the car and the Pirelli tyres at the Kyalami circuit in South Africa and at the Jacarepagua circuit in Brazil (it was reported that he had completed the equivalent of 75 full races in testing). The testing was completed in hot conditions which suited the Pirellis as it allowed them to quickly get up to working temperature which masked their major flaw - in cooler temperatures, the Pirelli tyres just could not get up to working temperature as quickly as the Goodyear tyres. Unfortunately, once the European races started the problem surfaced of the front tyres taking a long time to reach working temperature (much longer than the Goodyears) which caused severe understeer, a situation was not helped by the unseasonably cool European summer or the lack of weight at the front of the car.

Season summary
The only track and conditions on the 1985 calendar that suited the tyres was the Paul Ricard Circuit used for the French Grand Prix, run in very hot weather that year and, combined with the BMW engine that was very effective on the Ricard circuit's long Mistral straight Piquet used these factors to his full advantage. He qualified 5th and won his only Grand Prix of 1985.

The car's aerodynamics, paired with its potent BMW engine, saw that the BT54 did well on high-speed circuits and was often the fastest car down the straights, and Piquet often qualified higher up the grid at circuits like Paul Ricard, Silverstone, the Österreichring, Zandvoort, Spa-Francorchamps and Kyalami. However, the car was not as competitive on slow circuits, with Piquet never qualifying higher than 10th or finishing higher than 5th at any of the 3 street circuits (Monaco, Detroit, Adelaide) used in 1985. Other than the Dutch Grand Prix at Zandvoort, where Piquet got his only pole position for the season (compared to his 9 poles in ), the BT54 was generally off the pace of the front runners leaving Piquet little chance of regaining the World Drivers' Championship. Piquet's pole in the Netherlands came to nothing when he stalled at the start and by the time he was push started, he was already two-thirds of a lap behind.

At the European Grand Prix at Brands Hatch, Piquet qualified a strong 2nd, but on lap 7 drove into Keke Rosberg who had spun his Williams while challenging Ayrton Senna's Lotus for the lead at Surtees (with nowhere to go and no time to react, Piquet hit the Williams, taking off the BT54's nose cone and badly damaging the front left wheel and suspension). Marc Surer managed to get his BT54 up to 2nd before retiring with a fiery engine failure 13 laps from home.

Piquet, François Hesnault and Marc Surer, who replaced Hesnault from the Canadian Grand Prix for the rest of the season, could only score 26 points to finish 5th in the Constructors' Championship.

Aftermath
The BT54 was replaced for the  season by the Brabham BT55, although the team did use the BT54 for the 1986 British Grand Prix at Brands Hatch after the lack of results from the radical lowline BT55.

After seven seasons, 2 World Drivers' Championships and 12 wins, the BT54 was the last car Nelson Piquet drove for the Brabham team. With Brabham's declining competitiveness becoming apparent (giving Piquet just three wins in the two years since his  championship, during which time McLaren drivers Niki Lauda and Alain Prost had won 18 races between them and each respective World Championship), the Brazilian signed to drive for Williams-Honda in 1986. The move to Williams proved to be fruitful for Nelson, winning seven races in two seasons as well as the  World Championship.

Gallery

Complete Formula One results
(key) (results in bold indicate pole position)

References

Brabham Formula One cars
1985 Formula One season cars